The 2017 South Alabama Jaguars baseball team represents the University of South Alabama in the 2017 NCAA Division I baseball season. The Jaguars play their home games at Eddie Stanky Field.

Roster

Coaching staff

Schedule and results
South Alabama announced its 2017 baseball schedule on November 7, 2016. The 2017 schedule consisted of 25 home and 31 away games in the regular season. The Jaguars hosted Sun Belts foes Coastal Carolina, Georgia State, Little Rock, Texas State, and Troy and will travel to Appalachian State, Arkansas State, Georgia Southern, Louisiana–Lafayette, and Louisiana–Monroe.

The 2017 Sun Belt Conference Championship was contested May 24–28 in Statesboro, Georgia, and hosted by Georgia Southern.

South Alabama finished 2nd in the east division of the conference which qualified the Jaguars to compete in the tournament as the 3rd seed for the team's 12th tournament title.

 Rankings are based on the team's current  ranking in the Collegiate Baseball poll.

References

South Alabama
South Alabama Jaguars baseball seasons
South Alabama
South Alabama